David Vavruška (born 14 September 1972) is a Czech football coach. His last job was as a head coach of Czech 2. Liga football club Viktoria Žižkov. He took over at the half way stage of the 2016–17 season with the club comfortably in a mid-table (7th) position in the league, shortly after the surprising departure of Zdeněk Hašek .

In May 2011, he was announced as joint caretaker manager of Příbram until the end of the season alongside František Kopač following the departure of Roman Nádvorník. On 26 May 2011, Vavruška was given the manager's position on a permanent basis with Kopač and Jiří Ryba becoming his assistants. Vavruška's departure from Příbram was announced at the end of August 2012, following a run of 12 competitive games without a win. He joined Czech 2. Liga side Opava after four matches of the 2012–13 season, with the club lying in penultimate place in the league. He resigned from Opava in May 2013, with the club still in the same position, with the club having taken just 18 points in his 22 matches in charge. The club was subsequently relegated at the end of the season.

He was appointed as the manager of Viktoria Žižkov in 2016. He was sacked on 4 October 2017 after a run of poor results, including a 5–1 home defeat by his former club, Opava.

Managerial honours

 Liberec
Czech Cup (1): 2014–15

References

External links
 Profile at idnes.cz 
 

1972 births
Living people
Czech football managers
Czech First League managers
1. FK Příbram managers
SFC Opava managers
FC Slovan Liberec managers
FK Teplice managers
FK Viktoria Žižkov managers
Czech National Football League managers